Kotapur is a village in the Jajpur district of India.

Villages in Jajpur district